Sven-Åke Johansson (born 1943 in Mariestad) is a Swedish composer, drummer, poet, author and visual artist associated with European free jazz and free improvisation, who has lived in Berlin since 1968.

Johansson is one of the first European free jazz drummers: he was part of the Peter Brötzmann trio that recorded For Adolphe Sax (1967) and Machine Gun (1968), alongside bassist Peter Kowald. Johansson briefly joined an early incarnation of Tangerine Dream in 1968, played in the Globe Unity Orchestra and with German reedist Alfred Harth and Belgian pianist Nicole Van den Plas in E.M.T. In 1972, he recorded and released Schlingerland, one of the first solo free jazz recordings by a drummer. Johansson formed a long-running duo with pianist Alexander von Schlippenbach in 1976.

Johansson has contributed to numerous exhibitions, publications and hundreds of recordings. He has also produced radio plays for several German radio stations.

Since 2010, he has been working in collaboration with Oliver Augst. The concert program Eisler im Sitzen and various radio plays were created. For example In St. Wendel am Schloßplatz, which was broadcast on Deutschlandfunk in 2017 and presented live at various locations.

References

External links 
  with complete Discography
 Sven-Åke Johansson discography at Discogs

1943 births
Living people
People from Mariestad Municipality
Swedish jazz drummers
Free jazz drummers
Globe Unity Orchestra members
Atavistic Records artists
FMP/Free Music Production artists
Intakt Records artists